Paul Falknor Iams (August 11, 1915 in Dayton, Ohio – October 26, 2004 in Chappaqua, New York) was the founder of the  Iams Company which is known for its line of pet foods.

Life
Iams graduated from the Ohio State University in 1937, and sold dog food during the Great Depression. He learned that not even severe economic hardship would stop owners from buying food to feed their pets. This was a revelation to Iams, as most owners fed their pets leftovers or their own concoctions. A self-taught animal nutritionist, Iams founded his company in 1946, and, by 1950, was creating his own recipes in his own plant in Dayton.

When he retired in 1982, Iams sold his stake in the company to his business partner, who sold the company to Procter & Gamble in 1999.

Paul Iams was born in Dayton, Ohio on August 11, 1915. He was a talented high school athlete who won the Ohio State Tennis Championship in 1933. In 1937, he graduated from Ohio State University and became interested in the pet food business while working with his father, Harry, a grain broker. He joined Procter & Gamble in 1938 and was a soap salesman before joining the Navy in World War II.

After completing his service, Iams decided to create high quality pet food, based on his original nutritional theories and research. He was convinced that there was a strong specialty market for a nutritionally complete dog food. His original customer base was composed of Midwestern veterinarians and dog breeders.

In 1950, he opened his first manufacturing plant in Dayton, Ohio with five employees. He named his first dog food, "Iams 999" to imply that it was nearly perfect.

In 1982, Iams sold the business to Clay Mathile, who had joined Iams in 1970 and was Paul's business partner and friend. In 1999, the Mathiles sold The Iams Company to Procter and Gamble.

In 1987, the Paul F. Iams Technical Center in Lewisburg, Ohio was opened as a research facility dedicated to researching the emotional and physical needs of companion animals.

Paul Iams died at the age of 89, on Tuesday, October 26, 2004 in Chappaqua, New York. Until a month earlier, he had lived in Sun City West, Arizona where he retired in 1982 with his wife, the former Jane Landrum, who died in 1996.

References

External links

Iams Company

1915 births
2004 deaths
Businesspeople from Dayton, Ohio
Ohio State University alumni
American nutritionists
People from Chappaqua, New York
20th-century American businesspeople
American company founders